Ana Tereza Milanez de Lossio e Seiblitz or Tereza Seiblitz (born June 29, 1964) is a Brazilian actress.

She made an appearance in the Brazilian series, Malhação, on the Rede Globo network, in 2002. She was also the protagonist on the Brazilian telenovela Explode Coração, of Glória Perez, in 1995, opposite the Brazilian actor Edson Celulari.

Currently, she plays Lígia Salgado, a mother and desperate housewife, in the Brazilian version of Desperate Housewives, Donas de Casa Desesperadas. In original version of this series, the character is Lynette Scavo, interpreted for Felicity Huffman.

Biography 

Daughter of the anthropologist Zélia and of the doctor Maurício Seiblitz, Tereza graduated in Literature and Artistic Education.

Her surname Milanez is from her grandfather, José de Brito Milanez, who came from the region between Paraíba and Pernambuco, from Lossio and Seiblitz came from the family of her father, who is of Spanish origin.

Career
She began in artistic life as a dancer, through her gift of dancing participated in musicals in the theater. He studied at CAL with Paulo Betti, Moacyr Góes and Tizuka Yamazaki, with whom he had the opportunity to be directed in the feature film Fica Comigo.

The actress made her debut on television in the great success Barriga de Aluguel, where she lived the antagonist Laura, then made Pedra sobre Pedra, gained notoriety in the novel Renascer as a wife of Tião Galinha, played by Osmar Prado, later in the plot, would live a romance with the priest Lívio (Jackson Costa). In 1994, Tereza starred in the special Uma Mulher Vestida de Sol and in 1995, she starred in the telenovela Explode Coração, by Glória Perez, as the gypsy Dara, alongside Edson Celulari. In 2002, he participated in Malhação. He also performed three episodes of Você Decide, a Renato Aragão Especial, and a Linha Direta.

From August 2007 to January 2008, she played the character Lígia Salgado, a housewife, in the Brazilian version of Desperate Housewives, in Rede TV, directed by Fábio Barreto.

In the theater, it stood out in diverse productions, among them O Avarento, text of Molière, in which it counted on the actor Tonico Pereira. In 2009, he made Bodas de Sangue by Garcia Lorca, directed by Amir Haddad in a short season at the Tom Jobim Theater. In 2010, he was in the play Escola de Molières.

In the movies, he starred in the film High School Musical: O Desafio.

In 2011, the actress paraded in the carnival, at the samba school Porto da Pedra, where she represented "Maroquinhas Fru-Fru", which recalled the work of the writer Maria Clara Machado. In 2015, Tereza returned to television in four episodes of the series Milagres de Jesus, where Mary lived.

Due to the care devoted to his children, he has already refused to work on television, as in the novel O Amor Está no Ar, Estrela-Guia and O Clone.

Personal life 

She is the mother of Manuela, born on February 13, 1998, the result of a brief relationship with actor André Gonçalves.

She was married for four years to filmmaker Luiz Fernando Carvalho, with whom she has a son named Vittório, born on June 8, 2001, as a result of a loving relapse of the couple after two years of separation.

On April 8, 2006, born Juliano, the son of José Maurício Parreira Horta, was born the musician Kiko Horta, from the group Cordão do Boitatá, his ex-husband.

Filmography

Television

Films

Theater

References 

Brazilian television actresses
1964 births
Living people
Brazilian people of German descent
Actresses from Rio de Janeiro (city)